The American Federation of Musicians defines arranging as "the art of preparing and adapting an already written composition for presentation in other than its original form. An arrangement may include reharmonization, paraphrasing, and/or development of a composition, so that it fully represents the melodic, harmonic, and rhythmic structure".  Jazz arrangers often take music written for other forms like popular music, religious music, or classical music and alter the tempo, rhythm, and the chord structure to re-create music for a jazz idiom. They can also take so-called head arrangements and commit them to paper.

A
Mike Abene
Muhal Richard Abrams
Toshiko Akiyoshi
Manny Albam
Dominic Alldis
Norman Amadio
Kenneth Ascher
Clarice Assad
Grażyna Auguścik

B
Rüdiger Baldauf
Louis Banks
Eddie Barefield
Guy Barker
George Barnes
John Barry
Steve Barta 
Count Basie
Edgar Battle
Alan Baylock
Jim Beard
Heinie Beau
John Hubbard Beecher
Bob Belden
Louie Bellson
David Berger
David Berkman
Harry Betts
Carla Bley
David Bloom
Mike Bogle
Benjamín Brea
Leon Breeden
Buddy Bregman
Alan Broadbent
Bob Brookmeyer
Dudley Brooks
John Brooks
Sylvia Brooks
Raymond Harry Brown
Steve Brown
Gary Brunotte
James Tim Brymn
Miroslav Bukovsky
Ralph Burns
Billy Byers

C

Uri Caine
Charles Calello
Benny Carter
James Chirillo
John Clayton
Kenny Clayton
Avishai Cohen
Al Cohn
Bobby Cole
Jacob Collier
Alice Coltrane
John Coltrane
Chris Combs
Frank Comstock
Ray Conniff
Doc Cook
Jack Cooper
Eric Copeland
Don Costa
Hank Crawford
Roy Crimmins
Gary Crosby
Alexander Cuesta
Bill Cunliffe
Bob Curnow

D
Jimmy Dale
Børre Dalhaug
Tadd Dameron
Sir John Dankworth
Dol Dauber
Michael Daugherty
Wild Bill Davis
Ernesto De Pascale
Maria Pia De Vito
Eli Degibri
Eumir Deodato
Frank De Vol
Vojislav Đonović
George Duke
Eddie Durham

E
Malcolm Edmonstone
Richard Edwards
Eliane Elias
Duke Ellington
Alfred "Pee Wee" Ellis
Don Ellis
Atilla Engin
Dave Eshelman
James Reese Europe
Gil Evans

F
Bill Finegan
Clare Fischer
Stewart "Dirk" Fischer
Bob Florence
Fred Ford
Reginald Foresythe
Frank Foster
Stan Freberg
Russ Freeman
Stan Freeman
Paolo Fresu
Adrian Fry
Gil Fuller

G
Hal Galper
Allan Ganley
Joe Garland
Carlos Garnett
Chris Geith
James Gelfand
Herb Geller
Russ Gershon
Michael Gibbs
Andy Gibson
Dizzy Gillespie
Joe Gilman
Vince Giordano
Jimmy Giuffre
Harry Gold
Benny Golson
Benny Goodman
Gordon Goodwin
Alain Goraguer
Jerry Gray
Ferde Grofé
George Gruntz
Dave Grusin
Guttorm Guttormsen

H
Jurre Haanstra
Tim Hagans
Barrie Lee Hall Jr.
James A. Hall
Jim Hall
Morten Halle
Louis Halmy
Lenny Hambro
Jimmy Hamilton
Bob Hammer
Slide Hampton
Herbie Hancock
George Handy
Ken Hanna
Buster Harding
Tom Harrell
Raymond Harry Brown
Joe Haymes
Miho Hazama
Scott Healy
Jimmy Heath
Neal Hefti
Eirik Hegdal
Fletcher Henderson
Horace Henderson
Luther Henderson
Rick Henderson
Michel Herr
Nikolaj Hess
André Hodeir
Jan Gunnar Hoff
Bill Holman
Geir Holmsen
Kenyon Hopkins
Shirley Horn
Gary Husband
Margie Hyams
Dick Hyman

I
Edward Inge
Cecil Irwin

J
Christian Jacob
Bob James
Gordon Jenkins
J. J. Johnson
Osie Johnson
Sy Johnson
Hank Jones
Herbie Jones
Jimmy Jones
Oliver Jones
Quincy Jones
Thad Jones
Bert Joris
Julian Joseph

K
Egil Kapstad
Nikolai Kapustin
Kjell Karlsen
Dick Katz
Tom Kazas
George Kelly
Hal Kemp
Stan Kenton
Zvi Keren
Kishon Khan
Tony Kinsey
Iver Kleive
Steve Klink
Tom Kubis

L
John LaBarbera
Pocho Lapouble
Charles W. LaRue
Steve Laury
Andy LaVerne
Graham Lear
Kuh Ledesma
Amy Lee
William Franklin Lee III
Michel Legrand
Brian Lemon
Hank Levy
John Lewis
Magnus Lindgren
Gary Lindsay
David Lindup
Joe Lipman
Fred Lipsius
Melba Liston
Fud Livingston
Curtis Lundy
Arun Luthra
Bruce Lynch
Attila László

M
Earl MacDonald
Machito
Dennis Mackrel
Taj Mahal
Willie Maiden
Rob Madna
Henry Mancini
Johnny Mandel
Gap Mangione
André Manoukian
Frank Mantooth
Arif Mardin
Lou Marini
Skip Martin
Dmitri Matheny
Matty Matlock
David Matthews
Billy May
Lyle Mays
Gary McFarland
Howard McGhee
Tom McIntosh
Neil McLean
Jim McNeely
Vince Mendoza
Don Menza
Emil Mijares
Glenn Miller
Bob Mintzer
Shinji Miyazaki
Thelonious Monk
Phil Moore
James Morrison
Jelly Roll Morton
Michael Philip Mossman
Ken Moule
Rob Mounsey
Gerry Mulligan
Jimmy Mundy
Spud Murphy
Ronald Myers

N
Randy Napoleon
Kenny Napper
Vickie Natale
Oliver Nelson
Sammy Nestico
Ed Neumeister
Keith Nichols
Lennie Niehaus

O
Dale Oehler
Chico O'Farrill
Claus Ogerman
Sy Oliver
Hasan Cihat Örter
Marcus Österdahl

P
Marty Paich
Charlie Parker
Aris Pavlis
Jaco Pastorius
George Paxton
Tommy Pederson
Kim Pensyl
Jack Petersen
Herbie Phillips
Sid Phillips
Nat Pierce
Bill Potts
Pino Presti
André Previn
Brian Priestley
Rob Pronk
Tito Puente

R
Bill Ramsay
Ray Reach
Don Redman
Ilja Reijngoud
Don Rendell
Mike Renzi
Todd Rhodes
Goff Richards
Johnny Richards
Kim Richmond
Nelson Riddle
Jim Riggs
Doug Riley
Joe Riposo
Joe Roccisano
Ruben Rodriguez
Shorty Rogers
Gene Roland
Tony Romandini
Jerry van Rooyen
Florian Ross
Rashawn Ross
Scott Routenberg
Pete Rugolo
George Russell
Bill Russo

S
Philippe Saisse
A. K. Salim
Steve Sample Sr.
John Sangster
Jovino Santos Neto
Eddie Sauter
Jan Savitt
Paulus Schäfer
Lalo Schifrin
Maria Schneider
Vic Schoen
Arthur Schutt
Don Sebesky
Cheick Tidiane Seck
Roger Segure
Matyas Seiber, sometimes under the pseudonym G. S. Mathis
Paul Severson
John Sheridan
Yasuaki Shimizu
Wayne Shorter
Don Sickler
Julian Siegel
Terry Silverlight
Even Kruse Skatrud
Erlend Skomsvoll
Harry South
Earle Spencer
Russ Spiegel
Peter Sprague
Patrick Stanfield Jones
Bill Stegmeyer
Lanny Steele
Jimmy Stewart
George Stone
Billy Strayhorn
Walt Stuart
Fred Sturm
Ed Summerlin
Tierney Sutton

T
Dan Terry
Mia Theodoratus
Frode Thingnæs
Claude Thornhill
James Tim Brymn
Mel Tormé
Eugenio Toussaint
Jiří Traxler
David W. Tucker
Steve Turre
Alvin Tyler
Jeff Tyzik

V
Dick Vance
Alexander Vladimirovich Varlamov
Johnny Varro
Tommy Vig

W
Chris Walden
Jack Walrath
Mervyn Warren
Trevor Watkis
Fritz Weiss
Erling Wicklund
Vaughn Wiester
Bob Wilber
Edward Wilkerson
Ernie Wilkins
Mary Lou Williams
Alex Wilson
Gerald Wilson
John Wilson
Phil Wilson
Stanley Wilson
Sam Wooding
Phil Woods
Denny Wright
Rayburn Wright
Jan Ptaszyn Wróblewski

Y
Jacob Young

Z
Joe Zawinul
Lev Zhurbin
Torrie Zito
Bob Zurke

References

Arrangers